Chutimon Chuengcharoensukying  (born 2 February 1996), nicknamed Aokbab, is a Thai model and actress, best known for her role as Lynn in the 2017 film Bad Genius. She is the first Thai actress to win the Screen International Rising Star Asia Award in New York Asian Film Festival in 2017.

Early life and education 
Chutimon was born on 2 February 1996 in Bangkok, Thailand. She is currently studying at the Faculty of Fine and Applied Arts at Chulalongkorn University. Her nickname is "Aokbab", which means 'to design' in Thai.

Career 
Chutimon started to be a model since she was only 15. She was the first Thai model who had a chance to be in Harper's Bazaar UK, October 2013 in "A shadow of a jade empire" theme. She also featured in music videos such as "Unfriend" song by Helmetheads and "Pajhonpai" song by Mrs.Slave. She took an important role of the viral short film by Nawapol Thamrongrattanarit, "Thank you for Sharing". 
Chutimon's first acting role is Lynn, which helped her gain her popularity and praise of her good acting in the film Bad Genius in 2017. For Chutimon's portrayal of the character Lynn, she became the first Thai actress who won the Screen International Rising Star Asia award, at the 16th New York Asian Film Festival 2017.

Filmography

Film

Television series

Awards and nominations

References

External links 
 

1996 births
Living people
Chutimon Chuengcharoensukying
Chutimon Chuengcharoensukying
Chutimon Chuengcharoensukying
Chutimon Chuengcharoensukying
Chutimon Chuengcharoensukying
Chutimon Chuengcharoensukying
Best Newcomer Asian Film Award winners